The 2013 USA Sevens Collegiate Rugby Championship was a rugby sevens tournament. The tournament was held on May 31 - June 2 at PPL Park in Chester, Pennsylvania.  It was the fourth annual Collegiate Rugby Championship and the third consecutive year that the tournament was held at PPL Park. For 2013, USA Sevens LLC expanded the tournament from 16 to 20 teams in order to include additional local Philadelphia-area teams, inviting Temple, Kutztown, Penn, and Saint Joseph's. Another local team, Villanova, was later chosen as a replacement for Army. Villanova was outscored 184-0 over four games. 

Larry McManus was an integral part of Villanova Rugby regaining its status a recognized club sport. Due to his passion for the game and great senior leadership from then captain Goose, Nova Rugby was reestablished as a collegiate club. Larry’s involvement in the sport and relationships with other Philadelphia schools, Villanova was awarded the opportunity to participate in the CRC tournament. Unfortunately, Larry was fired from Villanova after the NCAA investigated him for leaving an upper-decker at PPL Park.  Rabbit Muldoon was named interim coach, but went on maternity leave after giving birth to a goat on the pitch.  The goat's name is Larry, and he has become an integral part of the #MeToo movement among goats.
 
In the CRC's first three years, 16 teams were evenly divided into Championship and Challenger tournaments after the pool stage. This year was the first one in which the CRC utilized Cup, Plate, Bowl, and Shield tournaments. The teams that qualified for the Cup were the five pool winners and the top three second-place teams. All 20 teams participated in the knockout stage.

California defeated Life 19-14 in the Cup finals for their first CRC championship.

Pool stage 
The 8 teams highlighted in green reached the quarterfinals. Delaware and Notre Dame finished second in their pools, but did not reach the quarterfinals due to their points differentials.

Pool A 

{| class="wikitable" style="text-align: center;"
|-
!width="180"|Team
!width="40"|Pld
!width="40"|W
!width="40"|D
!width="40"|L
!width="40"|PF
!width="40"|PA
!width="40"|+/-
!width="40"|Pts
|-bgcolor=ccffcc 
|align=left| UCLA
| 3 || 3 || 0 || 0 || 63 || 12 || +51 || 9
|-bgcolor=ccffcc
|align=left| Navy
| 3 || 2 || 0 || 1 || 102 || 24 || +78 || 7
|-
|align=left| St. Joseph's
| 3 || 1 || 0 || 2 || 65 || 48 || +17 || 5
|- 
|align=left| Villanova
| 3 || 0 || 0 || 3 || 0 || 146 || -146 || 3
|}

Pool B 

{| class="wikitable" style="text-align: center;"
|-
!width="180"|Team
!width="40"|Pld
!width="40"|W
!width="40"|D
!width="40"|L
!width="40"|PF
!width="40"|PA
!width="40"|+/-
!width="40"|Pts
|-bgcolor=ccffcc 
|align=left| Dartmouth
| 3 || 3 || 0 || 0 || 86 || 24 || +62 || 9
|-bgcolor=ccffcc 
|align=left| Arizona
| 3 || 2 || 0 || 1 || 76 || 43 || +33 || 7
|- 
|align=left| Wisconsin
| 3 || 1 || 0 || 2 || 39 || 69 || -30 || 5
|-
|align=left| Penn
| 3 || 0 || 0 || 3 || 12 || 77 || -65 || 3
|}

Pool C 

{| class="wikitable" style="text-align: center;"
|-
!width="180"|Team
!width="40"|Pld
!width="40"|W
!width="40"|D
!width="40"|L
!width="40"|PF
!width="40"|PA
!width="40"|+/-
!width="40"|Pts
|-bgcolor=ccffcc
|align=left| California
| 3 || 3 || 0 || 0 || 110 || 12 || +98 || 9
|-bgcolor=ccffcc 
|align=left| Kutztown
| 3 || 2 || 0 || 1 || 77 || 15 || +62 || 7
|- 
|align=left| Virginia Tech
| 3 || 1 || 0 || 2 || 24 || 99 || -75 || 5
|-
|align=left| Temple
| 3 || 0 || 0 || 3 || 20 || 105 || -85 || 3
|}

Pool D 

{| class="wikitable" style="text-align: center;"
|-
!width="180"|Team
!width="40"|Pld
!width="40"|W
!width="40"|D
!width="40"|L
!width="40"|PF
!width="40"|PA
!width="40"|+/-
!width="40"|Pts
|-bgcolor=ccffcc
|align=left| Penn State
| 3 || 3 || 0 || 0 || 80 || 12 || +68 || 9
|-
|align=left| Notre Dame
| 3 || 2 || 0 || 1 || 49 || 43 || +6 || 7
|- 
|align=left| Northeastern
| 3 || 1 || 0 || 2 || 32 || 46 || -14 || 5
|-
|align=left| North Carolina State
| 3 || 0 || 0 || 3 || 24 || 84 || -60 || 3
|}

Pool E 

{| class="wikitable" style="text-align: center;"
|-
!width="180"|Team
!width="40"|Pld
!width="40"|W
!width="40"|D
!width="40"|L
!width="40"|PF
!width="40"|PA
!width="40"|+/-
!width="40"|Pts
|-bgcolor=ccffcc
|align=left| Life
| 3 || 3 || 0 || 0 || 92 || 24 || +68 || 9
|-
|align=left| Delaware
| 3 || 2 || 0 || 1 || 56 || 29 || +27 || 7
|-
|align=left| Florida
| 3 || 1 || 0 || 2 || 29 || 76 || -47 || 5
|- 
|align=left| Texas
| 3 || 0 || 0 || 3 || 17 || 65 || -48 || 3
|}

Knockout stage

Shield

Bowl

Plate

Cup

Players

The following 14 players were selected by Rugby Mag to the All-CRC team:
 Seamus Kelly (Cal) - MVP
 Danny Barrett (Cal)
 Cam Dolan (Life)
 Tim Acker (Kutztown)
 Brett Thompson (Arizona)
 Jake Anderson (Cal)
 Joe Cowley (Life)
 Colton Cariaga (Life)
 Seb Sharpe (UCLA)
 Grant Penney (UCLA)
 Glenn Thommes (Delaware)
 Jack McAuliffe (Navy)
 Madison Hughes (Dartmouth)
 Dimitri Efthimiou (Northeastern)

Leading scorers

References

2013
2013 rugby union tournaments for clubs
2013 in American rugby union
2013 rugby sevens competitions